Harong Hurong is the name of an ancient cave in the Sylhet region of Bangladesh. The word Harong Hurong are the two dialects of two ancient Sylheti word. In Sylheti language, the word 'harong' means narrow or alternative route, and 'hurang' means 'tunnel'. That is, the word 'harong hurong' refers to the alternative tunnel way. There is a legend that, in 1303, when the king of Gour Govinda heard the news of Shahjalal's arrival in the region, he along with his army fled through the tunnel and was missing forever.

Etymology 
Hurong (হুরং) is the Sylheti dialectical form of the word ( literally meaning tunnel), and the word Hurong is used to mean the bamboo bridge in many areas of Sylhet and Sunamganj. So, if Hurong means a landscape or alternative route through a barrier, then Harong-Hurong describes an alternative tunnel route. The tunnel is known by the people of the garden as "Gaur Govind Radha Cave"; where every Saturday and Tuesday they offer worships.

Location 
Harong Hurong tunnel is located in the remote area of Malnicherra, the first commercial tea estate in the subcontinent. This tunnel is located south of Telihathi, next to section No-14 of the Hiluachara Tea Garden.

Myth 
The tunnel dates back to about seven hundred years or more. As a result, many folk tales and myths are prevalent among the locals. Many people think that the tunnel extends to Jaintia. It is reported that none of the people who entered into the cave came out alive. And even though who has come out, he has died in a short period of time. Three Indian Tantrikas entered here. Only one of them returned and lived very short time. He was abnormal until his death. A wealthy businessman from Sylhet took an initiative to dig it, but he stopped the renovation work in the midst of seeing an unusual dream. An old man of this village entered of his youth. When he sees something supernatural, he comes out with panic. Since then the man is mad, even the famous Kabiraj of Telheti could not cure him.

References

History of Sylhet
Caves of Bangladesh
Tourist attractions in Sylhet